Fernside, or the Vacation House for Working Girls, is a historic former resort hotel at 162 Mountain Road in Princeton, Massachusetts.  It is a complex of three buildings: its main house, a barn that was converted into a playhouse, and a two-car garage.  The core of the main house is a Federal style house built in 1835 by Benjamin Harrington.  The house was converted for use as a summer hotel around 1870, and in 1890 it was acquired by the Working Girls' Vacation Society as a place to provide summer recreation for city working women.  It is around this time that wings were added to the house, and the barn was converted to a playhouse.  The property was used by the Society until it was sold in 1989.  The facility is now owned by McLean Hospital, who used it as a drug treatment center.

The complex was listed on the National Register of Historic Places in 2002.  It is the best-preserved surviving resort hotel of several that were built in Princeton in the late 19th and early 20th centuries, and may be the oldest resort catering to working women in the nation.

See also
Working Girls' Vacation Society Historic District, East Haddam, Connecticut, also NRHP-listed
National Register of Historic Places listings in Worcester County, Massachusetts

References

External links
Records of Fernside, 1878-1998. Schlesinger Library, Radcliffe Institute, Harvard University.

Buildings and structures in Princeton, Massachusetts
Houses completed in 1835
Hotel buildings on the National Register of Historic Places in Massachusetts
Houses on the National Register of Historic Places in Massachusetts
National Register of Historic Places in Worcester County, Massachusetts
Federal architecture in Massachusetts
History of women in Massachusetts